San Giovanni Battista dei Genovesi (Saint John the Baptist of the Genoans) is a Roman Catholic church on via Anicia in the Trastevere district of Rome. It is the regional church for Genoa.

It was built between 1481 and 1492 by the wealthy Genoan Meliaduce Cicala, treasurer of the Camera Apostolica. It was an addition to a hospital for Genoese sailors which Cicala built at porto di Ripa Grande. In 1533 the Confraternity of Genoans was founded to administer the church and the hospital - the latter continued to function until the mid 18th century.

The church was rebuilt in 1737, with an apse added to its facade. It was then little altered until the mid 19th century, when a new facade was added and the interior redesigned.

In 1890 the confraternity was renamed Opera Pia.

Bibliography 
 Mariano Armellini Le chiese di Roma dal secolo IV al XIX, Roma 1891
 G. Carpaneto, Rione XIII Trastevere, in AA.VV, I rioni di Roma, Newton & Compton Editori, Milano 2000, Vol. III, pp. 831–923
Alberto Manodori, San Giovanni Battista dei Genovesi - la chiesa l'ospizio e la confraternita, Roma 1983 
 C. Rendina, Le Chiese di Roma, Newton & Compton Editori, Milano 2000, p. 130-131

Roman Catholic churches in Rome
National churches in Rome
Churches of Rome (rione Trastevere)